Jason Kyle Canizaro (born July 4, 1973) is an American former professional baseball second baseman who spent parts of four seasons in Major League Baseball (MLB) with the San Francisco Giants and the Minnesota Twins.

Career
Canizaro was drafted by the Giants in 1993 in the fourth round of the draft after playing at Oklahoma State.  He made his major league debut in 1996 with the team, but returned to the minors until 1999, when he was again called up.  Following the 1999 season, he signed a contract with the Minnesota Twins.  He enjoyed his best season in baseball with the Twins in 2000, hitting .269 as the Twins' primary second baseman.  After the 2002 season with the Twins, his last in the majors, Canizaro signed a minor league contract with the Tampa Bay Devil Rays, but failed to make the major league roster and left baseball the following season.

External links
, or Retrosheet, or Pelota Binaria (Venezuelan Winter League)

1973 births
Living people
American expatriate baseball players in Canada
Arizona League Giants players
Baseball players from Texas
Blinn Buccaneers baseball players
Cardenales de Lara players
American expatriate baseball players in Venezuela
Durham Bulls players
Edmonton Trappers players
Fresno Grizzlies players
Major League Baseball second basemen
Minnesota Twins players
Oklahoma State Cowboys baseball players
Phoenix Firebirds players
Salt Lake Buzz players
San Francisco Giants players
San Jose Giants players
Shreveport Captains players	
Sportspeople from Beaumont, Texas